This is a comprehensive list of the awards received by 2NE1, a girl group formed by YG Entertainment in South Korea. Their first extended play, 2NE1 (2009), was received well and spawned the hits "Fire" and "I Don't Care", one of the biggest singles of 2009. It earned 2NE1 many awards and nominations. After initial success in 2009, the group released their first full-length album in 2010, To Anyone. "Clap Your Hands", "Go Away", and "Can't Nobody" were used as promotional singles. In 2011, they came back with the second EP, 2NE1 2nd Mini Album (2011), which earned 2NE1 many awards and nominations, including Album of the Year, and Song of the Year for the lead single "I Am the Best".

They released four singles in 2012 to 2013, including the hits "I Love You" and "Missing You", and released their first full-album in Japan. They released their second full Korean album "Crush" in 2014 with the lead single "Come Back Home", and entered the Billboard 200 chart. In January 2017, they released a farewell song called "Goodbye" for their fans after the announce of their disbandment.



Awards and nominations

Other accolades

State honors

Listicles

Notes

References

External links

 
 

Awards
2NE1